Thimmaparam is a village situated in East Godavari district, in Andhra Pradesh State. It comes under Kakinada rural mandal. The distance from kakinada bus stand to Thimmapuram village is 8 km.

References
 

Villages in East Godavari district